Førde is the administrative centre of Sunnfjord Municipality in Vestland county, Norway. The town is located at the eastern end of the Førdefjorden, at the mouth of the river Jølstra.

The town of Førde is an important commercial, industrial, and government center for the area. The Øyrane area in the center of the town, along the harbor is the regional center for industry.  The town also has the local primary and secondary schools, as well as a folk high school. Furthermore, one of the two campuses of Sogn og Fjordane University College is located in Førde.  The Department of Engineering and Health Sciences for the college are located here (the other campus is in Sogndalsfjøra).  There is a branch of the county library in Førde as well as the Førde Central Hospital, owned by the Førde Health Trust.  The regional newspaper, Firda, is based out of the town Førde.  Førde Church is the main church for the town.

The town sits at the intersection of the highways Rv.5 and E39. The Rv. 5 highway connects Førde to the nearby town of Florø (via the Naustdal Tunnel) and the E39 highway connects Førde with the cities of Ålesund to the north and Bergen to the south. The old Førde Airport, Øyrane was located in the center of the town at Øyrane, but that airport was only used from 1971 until 1986.

Notable people

Media gallery

See also
List of towns and cities in Norway

References

Sunnfjord
Cities and towns in Norway
Populated places in Vestland
1997 establishments in Norway